Mahony & Zvosec, Architects & Planners was an American architectural practice based in Princeton, New Jersey, active in the mid to late-twentieth-century Connecticut, New York, New Jersey, and Pennsylvania. It was established in 1967 by Leo Halpin Mahony, AIA (born 1931), who had previously practiced under the name of Leo H. Mahony (fl. 1962–1967) and John M. Zvosec. The firm practiced out of the Gallup Robinson Building, Research Park, Princeton, New Jersey 08540.

Works as Mahony & Zvosec
1969: South Brunswick Township Public Library (South Brunswick, New Jersey)
1969: St. Anthony's Church & School (Highstown, New Jersey)
1969: St. Luke's Church & Rectory (North Plainfield, New Jersey)

References

Defunct architecture firms based in New Jersey
Architecture firms based in New Jersey
American ecclesiastical architects
Architects of Roman Catholic churches
Design companies established in 1967
1967 establishments in New Jersey